The 2016 Washington Kastles season was the ninth season of the franchise in World TeamTennis (WTT). The Kastles finished third in WTT with seven wins and five losses and missed the postseason for the first time since 2010, ending their run of five consecutive WTT championships.

Season recap

Draft
At the WTT Draft on March 25, 2016, the Kastles protected Martina Hingis in the marquee player portion of the draft. The Kastles also made a trade with the Orange County Breakers to acquire the fifth selection in the first round of the marquee player portion of the draft for undisclosed consideration. They used this pick to select Bob and Mike Bryan as a doubles team. In the second round of the marquee player portion of the draft, the Kastles chose Mardy Fish. All the Kastles' selections in the roster player portion of the draft were returning players from the 2015 team who were protected: Sam Querrey, team captain Leander Paes (2015 WTT Final Most Valuable Player), Madison Brengle and Anastasia Rodionova (2015 WTT Female Co-Most Valuable Player). In selecting Fish, the Kastles left Venus Williams unprotected. In protecting Querrey, the Kastles had to leave Denis Kudla unprotected.

Kastles sign Groth and Kyrgios
On June 15, 2016, the Kastles announced the signing of Sam Groth as a substitute player. Groth was scheduled to appear in the Kastles' matches on August 8, 10 and 13.

On July 22, 2016, the Kastles announced the signing of Nick Kyrgios as a wildcard player to appear in their August 13 match against the Orange County Breakers.

Querrey injured and Kudla returns
On July 29, 2016, the Kastles announced that Sam Querrey was injured and would miss the 2016 season. The Kastles re-signed Denis Kudla, a resident of nearby Arlington County, Virginia, as a substitute player. Kudla played for the Kastles in 2015, and won 51% of his games in singles and 67% of his games in men's doubles. Kudla was scheduled to play for the Kastles on July 31 and August 1, after which he would go to Rio de Janeiro to represent the United States at the 2016 Summer Olympics.

A solid start
The Kastles opened the season on the road as the opponent for the expansion New York Empire in its inaugural match on July 31, 2016. Captain Leander Paes and Denis Kudla, who arrived in New York City from Italy just hours before the match, got the Kastles started by taking a tiebreaker from Guido Pella and 2015 WTT Male Rookie of the Year Neal Skupski in men's doubles. Martina Hingis and Anastasia Rodionova followed with a 5–2 set win in women's doubles. Kudla was broken in the fourth game of the third set of men's singles and fell to fellow Olympian Pella, 5–2, to cut the Kastles lead to 12–11. Skupski and Christina McHale broke Paes's serve in the opening game of the fourth set of mixed doubles to tie the match at 12 all. However, Paes and Hingis broke back in the next game to get back on serve. A Hingis lob over McHale's head that landed on the far baseline secured another break for the Kastles in the sixth game, and they went on to take the set, 5–2, giving them a 17–13 lead heading to the final set. Madison Brengle closed out a 22–15 victory with a 5–2 set win over McHale in women's singles.

The following evening, Washington met the Springfield Lasers in the Kastles' home opener before a sellout crowd. Kudla was broken in the seventh game of the opening set of men's singles, and the Kastles found themselves behind, 5–3, early in the match. Brengle dominated the second set of women's singles, converting both of her break-point opportunities, and cruised to a 5–0 set win that gave the Kastles an 8–5 lead. Hingis and Bob Bryan took the court to open the third set of mixed doubles with Bryan holding serve. Coach Murphy Jensen then substituted Paes for Byran, reuniting the Hingis-Paes doubles team. They went on to take the set, 5–2, to increase the Kastles lead to 13–7. Hingis and Rodionova dropped a tiebreaker in the fourth set of women's doubles to cut the Kastles' lead to 17–12. The Bryan brothers held all their service games in the final set of men's doubles but could not convert any of their nine break-point opportunities. They won the set tiebreaker, 5–1, to secure a 22–16 victory for the Kastles.

The Kastles rematch with the Empire at home on August 2, 2016, did not go as expected. Mardy Fish opened the match by holding his service game in men's singles. After forcing a break point in the second game, he hobbled to the bench with a foot injury that ended his season. Paes was pressed into duty as a substitute for Fish. Although the 43-year-old Paes won a Bronze Medal in singles at the 1996 Summer Olympics, he had not appeared in a main draw in singles on the ATP Tour since 2005, and his last singles match came in an ITF tournament in 2008. Paes converted the break point Fish had created to give the Kastles a 2–0 lead. However, Pella managed to break back in the fifth game and eventually win the set tiebreaker, 5–2. Brengle continued her dominant play in women's singles by breaking McHale in both of her service games to take the set, 5–0, and give the Kastles a 9–5 lead. With Fish injured, the Kastles' 47-year-old coach Jensen took the court with Paes for the men's doubles set. Jensen, who won the men's doubles title at the 1993 French Open with his brother Luke, last appeared in an ATP Tour event in 2006. After the Empire broke Paes's serve in the fifth game, Jensen ran down a ball deep in the corner and returned it for a winner to earn a break point in the sixth game. His backhand return on the ensuing serve converted the break and got the Kastles back on serve. Pella and Skupski won the set tiebreaker, 5–3, to cut the Kastles' lead to 13–10. Hingis and Rodionova converted two breaks and held all three of their service games in women's doubles to increase the Kastles' lead to 18–11. Hingis and Paes closed out the match with a 5–3 set win in mixed doubles that gave the Kastles a 23–14 victory.

JP Smith replaces Fish and Rodionova goes to the Olympics
On August 3, 2016, the Kastles signed John-Patrick Smith as a substitute player to replace the injured Mardy Fish. The Kastles also lost Anastasia Rodionova, the 2015 WTT Female Co-Most Valuable Player, who was a late addition to the Australian Olympic team. They signed Andreja Klepač as a substitute player to replace Rodionova. Smith was scheduled to play only in the August 3 match, while Klepač was expected to remain with the team for the rest of the season. With the Kastles shorthanded, Leander Paes agreed to play in the August 3 match alongside Smith. Paes had a 10:05 pm flight that same evening to Rio de Janeiro to represent India at the Olympics. Paes went directly from Kastles Stadium to the airport after the match. The Kastles dropped four of the five sets and suffered a 23–18 home loss to the Philadelphia Freedoms.

On August 5, 2016, the Kastles signed Bjorn Fratangelo, Ken Skupski and Treat Huey as substitute players. Fratangelo and Skupski were scheduled to play for the team on August 5 and 6. Huey, who was born in Washington, D.C. and played for the Kastles in 2012, was scheduled to join the team on August 8, and play the remainder of the season.

Kastles lose four straight
On August 8, 2016, the Kastles announced they had signed Stéphane Robert as a substitute player to replace Sam Groth, who was called up to the Australian Olympic team. After Groth lost his first-round Olympic match to David Goffin, he returned to the Kastles for the remainder of the season.

After losing both matches on their West Coast road trip, including a 25–8 defeat at the hands of the Orange County Breakers, the worst loss in Kastles history, Washington carried a three-match losing streak into their home match with the New York Empire. Andreja Klepač and Treat Huey, who played together earlier in the year and reached the semifinals of the 2016 Australian Open, exchanged breaks of serve with María Irigoyen and Neal Skupski before falling in a set tiebreaker in the opening set of mixed doubles. Christina McHale got a measure of revenge against Madison Brengle, who had dominated her in their first two matchups earlier in the season, when she converted two breaks and denied Brengle on all three of her break-point opportunities to take the women's singles set, 5–1, and give the Empire a 10–5 lead. Huey and Robert won the men's doubles set in a tiebreaker to cut the Empire's lead to 14–10. The first three games of the women's doubles set featured two breaks by Brengle and Klepač and one by Irigoyen and McHale. Brengle settled things down by holding serve in the fourth game. She and Klepač secured another break in the seventh game to take the set, 5–2, and reduce the Kastles' deficit to 16–15. Robert and 2016 Wimbledon hero Marcus Willis each held all four of their service games in the final set of men's singles, and the Empire led, 20–19, going to the set tiebreaker. On match point, Willis hit a backhand into the net to knot the tiebreaker at 4 all. However, after a long rally on the set's deciding point, Willis hit a winner to give the Empire a 21–19 victory and cause the Kastles to suffer their first four-match losing streak since 2010.

The Kastles ended their losing streak the following evening in New York when they defeated the Empire, 22–13, in extended play. The Kastles were led by Brengle who blanked McHale, 5–0, in women's singles and teamed with Klepač for another 5–0 set win in women's doubles. Robert defended three break-point opportunities and managed to break Andy Roddick once for a 5–3 set win in men's singles. After dropping the fifth set of mixed doubles, Klepač and Huey won the first game of extended play to seal the victory.

Eliminated by winning
With a record of five wins and five losses, the Kastles were eliminated from postseason contention on August 21, 2016, when they won the third set of men's doubles in their match against the Springfield Lasers, 5–3. At the start of play, the Kastles could only qualify for the postseason in the case of a three-way tie with the Philadelphia Freedoms and the San Diego Aviators. In games won in matches against common opponents, the Aviators led with 149 with one common-opponent match to play, the Freedoms had 136 with one common-opponent match to play, and the Kastles had 118 with two common-opponent matches to play. Therefore, the maximum number of games the Kastles could win in matches against common opponents was 168 at the start of play. The Aviators won 19 games in the first four sets of their match against the New York Empire, which started one hour earlier than the Kastles' match in Springfield, to reach 168 games won against common opponents. The Kastles still could have won the next step of the three-way standings tiebreaker on fewest games lost in matches against common opponents. However, after dropping the first two sets of the match, the only way the Kastles could still reach 168 games won against common opponents was by losing the first four sets and then winning the match, 25–24, in a super tiebreaker. Therefore, in an odd set of circumstances, when the Kastles won the third set of their match, moments after the fourth set of the Aviators-Empire match was completed, the maximum number of games the Kastles could win against common opponents was reduced to 166, resulting in mathematical elimination and ending the Kastles' historic run of five consecutive WTT championships. It is the first time the Kastles have missed the postseason since 2010. The Kastles went on to win the match in which their run of championships came to an end, 21–20.

Event chronology
 March 25, 2016: The Kastles protected Martina Hingis, Sam Querrey, Leander Paes, Madison Brengle and Anastasia Rodionova and drafted Bob and Mike Bryan and Mardy Fish at the WTT draft. The Kastles left Venus Williams and Denis Kudla unprotected.
 June 15, 2016: The Kastles signed Sam Groth as a substitute player.
 July 22, 2016: The Kastles signed Nick Kyrgios as a wildcard player.
 July 29, 2016: The Kastles re-signed Denis Kudla as a substitute player.
 August 3, 2016: The Kastles signed John-Patrick Smith and Andreja Klepač as substitute players.
 August 5, 2016: The Kastles signed Bjorn Fratangelo, Ken Skupski and Treat Huey as substitute players.
 August 8, 2016: The Kastles signed Stéphane Robert as a substitute player.
 August 12, 2016: The Kastles were eliminated from postseason contention when they won the third set of their match against the Springfield Lasers. It is the first time the Kastles missed the postseason since 2010, and ends their run of five consecutive WTT championships.

Draft picks
As defending WTT champions, the Kastles selected last in each round of the draft. However, the Kastles also made a trade with the Orange County Breakers to acquire the fifth pick in the first round of the marquee player portion of the draft for undisclosed consideration. WTT conducted its 2016 draft during the Miami Open at the Tennis Center at Crandon Park in Key Biscayne, Florida on March 25. The selections made by the Kastles are shown in the table below.

Match log

{| align="center" border="1" cellpadding="2" cellspacing="1" style="border:1px solid #aaa"
|-
! colspan="2" style="background:#003372; color:white" | Legend
|-
! bgcolor="ccffcc" | Kastles Win
! bgcolor="ffbbbb" | Kastles Loss
|-
! colspan="2" | Home team in CAPS
|}

Team personnel
References:

On-court personnel
  Murphy Jensen, Player-Coach
  Madison Brengle
  Bob Bryan
  Mike Bryan
  Mardy Fish
  Bjorn Fratangelo
  Sam Groth
  Martina Hingis
  Treat Huey
  Andreja Klepač
  Denis Kudla
  Nick Kyrgios
  Leander Paes
  Sam Querrey
  Stéphane Robert
  Anastasia Rodionova
  Ken Skupski
  John-Patrick Smith

Front office
 Mark D. Ein, Owner
 Kevin Wynne, General Manager

Notes:

Statistics
Players are listed in order of their game-winning percentage provided they played in at least 40% of the Kastles' games in that event, which is the WTT minimum for qualification for league leaders in individual statistical categories.

Men's singles

Women's singles

Men's doubles

Women's doubles

Mixed doubles

Team totals

Individual achievements
Madison Brengle led WTT in winning percentage in women's singles and also tied for third with Andreja Klepač in women's doubles. Treat Huey was third in WTT in winning percentage in men's doubles.

Transactions
 March 25, 2016: The Kastles protected Martina Hingis, Sam Querrey, Leander Paes, Madison Brengle and Anastasia Rodionova and drafted Bob and Mike Bryan and Mardy Fish at the WTT draft. The Kastles left Venus Williams and Denis Kudla unprotected.
 June 15, 2016: The Kastles signed Sam Groth as a substitute player.
 July 22, 2016: The Kastles signed Nick Kyrgios as a wildcard player.
 July 29, 2016: The Kastles re-signed Denis Kudla as a substitute player.
 August 3, 2016: The Kastles signed John-Patrick Smith and Andreja Klepač as substitute players.
 August 5, 2016: The Kastles signed Bjorn Fratangelo, Ken Skupski and Treat Huey as substitute players.
 August 8, 2016: The Kastles signed Stéphane Robert as a substitute player.

See also

 Sports in Washington, D.C.

References

External links
Washington Kastles official website
World TeamTennis official website

Washington Kastles season
Washington Kastles